The Missouri Governor's Cup (also known as the Chiefs-Rams rivalry, or Cardinals-Chiefs rivalry) was a trophy awarded to the winner of the football game between Missouri's two National Football League (NFL) teams. 

Originally played for between the Kansas City Chiefs and the St. Louis Cardinals, the series went into recess after 1987 due to the Cardinals' relocation to Phoenix, Arizona at the end of the season, leaving the Chiefs as the only NFL team in Missouri.

In 1996, the year after the St. Louis Rams relocated from Los Angeles, the Governor's Cup series returned, and was played until 2015 in the preseason and the interconference regular season matchups between the Chiefs and Rams. 

The series went back into recess after the Rams relocated back to Los Angeles in 2016, leaving the Chiefs as the only NFL team in Missouri for a second time.

The local press occasionally referred to the game as The Battle of Missouri, The Show-Me State Showdown, or the I-70 Series.

History

1968–88
The contest began in 1968 when St. Louis had the football Cardinals  until the Cardinals' relocation in 1988. The Governor's Cup game was resumed in the 1996 season between the Chiefs and the Rams until the Rams' relocation in 2016.

The Chiefs posted a 16–7–2 mark in its Governor's Cup series against the Cardinals from 1968 to 1987, going 3–1–1 in the regular season record and 13–6–1 in preseason play.

1996–2015
When the Los Angeles Rams relocated to St. Louis, the rivalry among Missourians re-emerged. Both the Rams and the Chiefs possessed the two most productive offenses in the NFL in the early 2000s, and the meetings often resulted in shootouts. Former Rams coach Dick Vermeil was hired by the Chiefs in 2001 after he had won Super Bowl XXXIV with the Rams with one of the NFL's most powerful offensive squads in history.

Once the Chiefs created their own high-powered offense with the arrival of Vermeil, the rivalry became even more exciting. In often meaningless preseason games, the Chiefs and Rams gave all their energy to secure the Governor's Cup, their spot as the best offense in the league, and bragging rights for their respective city in Missouri.

Dick Vermeil faced off against his old coaching buddies with the Rams - including his offensive coordinator of "The Greatest Show on Turf", Mike Martz, who succeeded Vermeil for the Rams head coaching job.

St. Louis Cardinals vs. Kansas City Chiefs

All-Time pre-season results
The Chiefs and Cardinals met every pre-season to determine the best NFL team in Missouri.  The Chiefs lead the pre-season series 13–6–1.

The 1972 meeting was the first event in Arrowhead Stadium, which opened despite continuing construction.

All-Time regular season results
Note: The Governor's Cup was awarded between the Chiefs and the St. Louis Cardinals from 1968 through 1987, the Cardinals' final season in St. Louis.

The Chiefs won the regular reason series 3–1–1.

St. Louis Rams vs. Kansas City Chiefs

All-Time pre-season results
The Chiefs and Rams met in most pre-seasons from 1996 through 2015 to determine the best NFL team in Missouri.  The Rams, who moved to St. Louis in 1995, led the Missouri pre-season series 9–6, before returning to Los Angeles in 2016.

All-Time regular season results
Note: The Governor's Cup was not awarded for games between the Los Angeles Rams and Kansas City Chiefs, but only for games played during the Rams’ time in St. Louis (1995 to 2015).

The Chiefs won the regular season series 6–0.

See also
2018 Kansas City Chiefs–Los Angeles Rams game
Battle of Ohio (NFL)
I-70 Series
Governor's Cup (Texas)
Cardinals–Rams rivalry
Bears–Cardinals rivalry

References

National Football League rivalries
National Football League trophies and awards
American football in Missouri
Kansas City Chiefs
St. Louis Cardinals (football)
St. Louis Rams
Sports in the Kansas City metropolitan area
Sports in St. Louis
1970 establishments in Missouri
Dissolved sports rivalries